Manchester is a city in Dickinson County, Kansas, United States.  As of the 2020 census, the population of the city was 47.

History
Manchester was originally called Keystone, and under the latter name laid out in 1887. The name Manchester was adopted by 1890.

The post office in Manchester was discontinued in 1993.

In 1887, Atchison, Topeka and Santa Fe Railway built a branch line from Neva (3 miles west of Strong City) through Manchester to Superior, Nebraska.  In 1996, the 
Atchison, Topeka and Santa Fe Railway merged with Burlington Northern Railroad and renamed to the current BNSF Railway.  Most locals still refer to this railroad as the "Santa Fe".

In 1888, a rail line of the Chicago, Kansas and Western Railroad opened, starting from Manchester and running 43 miles west to Barnard  The Atchison, Topeka and Santa Fe Railway acquired the line 1901.  An application was filed in 1983 to abandon this "Minneapolis District" line.The Minneapolis District, Abandoned Rails, Retrieved 21 February 2022

Geography
Manchester is located at  (39.093657, -97.321501).

Demographics

2010 census
As of the census of 2010, there were 95 people, 38 households, and 24 families living in the city. The racial makeup of the city was 92.6% White, 4.2% Native American, 1.1% from other races, and 2.1% from two or more races. Hispanic or Latino of any race were 1.1% of the population.

There were 38 households, of which 34.2% had children under the age of 18 living with them, 36.8% were married couples living together, 18.4% had a female householder with no husband present, 7.9% had a male householder with no wife present, and 36.8% were non-families. 31.6% of all households were made up of individuals, and 7.9% had someone living alone who was 65 years of age or older. The average household size was 2.50 and the average family size was 3.21.

The median age in the city was 35.9 years. 31.6% of residents were under the age of 18; 3.1% were between the ages of 18 and 24; 26.4% were from 25 to 44; 30.5% were from 45 to 64; and 8.4% were 65 years of age or older. The gender makeup of the city was 54.7% male and 45.3% female.

2000 census
As of the census of 2000, there were 102 people, 46 households, and 31 families living in the city. The racial makeup of the city was 91.18% White, 0.98% African American, 0.98% Native American, 0.98% from other races, and 5.88% from two or more races. Hispanic or Latino of any race were 0.98% of the population.

There were 46 households, out of which 23.9% had children under the age of 18 living with them, 56.5% were married couples living together, 8.7% had a female householder with no husband present, and 32.6% were non-families. 26.1% of all households were made up of individuals, and 13.0% had someone living alone who was 65 years of age or older. The average household size was 2.22 and the average family size was 2.55.

In the city, the population was spread out, with 19.6% under the age of 18, 3.9% from 18 to 24, 29.4% from 25 to 44, 29.4% from 45 to 64, and 17.6% who were 65 years of age or older. The median age was 41 years. For every 100 females, there were 121.7 males. For every 100 females age 18 and over, there were 121.6 males.

The median income for a household in the city was $31,563, and the median income for a family was $32,500. Males had a median income of $22,500 versus $16,500 for females. The per capita income for the city was $14,035. There were 6.3% of families and 7.8% of the population living below the poverty line, including 12.0% of under eighteens and none of those over 64.

Education
The community is served by Chapman USD 473 public school district.  The Chapman High School mascot is Chapman Fighting Irish.

References

Further reading

External links

 Manchester - Directory of Public Officials
 Historic Images of Manchester, Special Photo Collections at Wichita State University Library
 Manchester city map, KDOT

Cities in Kansas
Cities in Dickinson County, Kansas
1887 establishments in Kansas
Populated places established in 1887